Air Vice Marshal Sir Paul Copeland Maltby,  (5 August 1892 – 2 July 1971) was a senior Royal Air Force officer who later served as the Serjeant at Arms in the House of Lords.

Military career
In 1942 Maltby was assistant Air Officer Commanding Far East Command and Air Officer Commanding RAF in Java. He ordered the formation of 225th RAF (Bomber) Group on 1 January 1942. Maltby arrived in West Java on 14 February 1942 and set up his headquarters at Soekaboemi. 
The allies suffered heavy losses of planes to the Japanese.

On 22 February 1942 the ABDA Command was dissolved. Churchill generally agreed with Wavell that Java should be fought for, but insisted that the main reinforcements should be sent to Burma and India and not to Java. The overall command was handed over to the Royal Netherlands East Indies Army. Churchill signaled Maltby the very next day: "I send you and all ranks of the British forces who have stayed behind in Java my best wishes for success and honour in the great fight that confronts you. Every day gained is precious, and I know that you will do everything humanly possible to prolong the battle". Maltby's main tasks were to continue the fight to defend Java as long as equipment could be maintained and do everything possible to evacuate surplus units and personnel to Ceylon or Australia.

The Japanese invasion force landed on Java at the end of February and the start of March. The allied forces were quickly beaten. On 12 March 1942 the senior British, Australian and American commanders were summoned to Bandoeng where the formal instrument of surrender was signed in the presence of the Japanese commander in the Bandoeng area, Lieutenant General Masao Maruyama, who promised them the rights of the Geneva Convention for the protection of prisoners of war.

From 1942 to 1945 Maltby was a prisoner of war.

Maltby's son John Newcombe Maltby married Lady Sylvia Harris, daughter of William Harris, 6th Earl of Malmesbury.

References

External links
Air of Authority – A History of RAF Organisation – Air Vice-Marshal Sir Paul Maltby
 

1892 births
1971 deaths
British World War II prisoners of war
Companions of the Distinguished Service Order
Companions of the Order of the Bath
Knights Commander of the Order of the British Empire
Knights Commander of the Royal Victorian Order
Recipients of the Air Force Cross (United Kingdom)
Royal Air Force air marshals
Royal Welch Fusiliers officers
British Army personnel of World War I
Royal Air Force personnel of World War II
Royal Flying Corps officers
Military personnel of British India
World War II prisoners of war held by Japan
People educated at Bedford School
Serjeants-at-arms of the House of Lords
British people in colonial India